Tone Danielsen (born 15 August 1946) is a Norwegian actress. She was an actress at Den Nationale Scene 1970–1971, the Hålogaland Teater 1971–1975, and from 1975 to the present at the National theatre. She appeared in the film Reprise

She is the granddaughter of Edvard Christian Danielsen. Actor Anders Danielsen Lie is her son. She played the mother of his character in Reprise (2006); they also starred together in 22 July (2018), although their characters were not related.

Selected filmography
 1965: Skjær i sjøen as Eva Mørk, Johannes's daughter
 1980: Belønningen as Unni
 1986: Blackout
 2006: Reprise as Inger
 2008: Troubled Water as Liss 
 2009: Upperdog
 2015–2016: Frikjent (Acquitted) (TV series) as Sigrid Kvamme
 2018: 22 July as Judge Wenche Arntzen

References

External links
 

Living people
1946 births
Norwegian stage actresses
Norwegian film actresses
Place of birth missing (living people)